Fernand Donna (30 January 1922 – 7 May 1988) was a French sprint canoeist who competed in the late 1940s. He was eliminated in the heats of the K-2 1000 m event at the 1948 Summer Olympics in London.

References
Fernand Donna's profile at Sports Reference.com

Canoeists at the 1948 Summer Olympics
French male canoeists
Olympic canoeists of France
1922 births
1988 deaths